UVV may refer to:
Unfallverhütungsvorschriften
UVV Utrecht
Universidade Vila Velha
Unie Vrijzinnige Verenigingen

See also
Ukrainian Liberation Army